Cheilea tortilis is a species of small limpet-like sea snail, a marine gastropod mollusk in the family Hipponicidae, the hoof snails.

Description
The size of the shell varies between 30 mm and 65 mm.

Distribution
This marine species occurs in the Red Sea and off Japan and the Philippines.

References

 Vine, P. (1986). Red Sea Invertebrates. Immel Publishing, London. 224 pp.

External links
 

Hipponicidae
Gastropods described in 1858